The men's coxless four competition at the 1988 Summer Olympics took place at took place at Han River Regatta Course, South Korea.

Competition format

The competition consisted of three main rounds (heats, semifinals, and finals) as well as a repechage. The 15 boats were divided into three heats for the first round, with 5 boats in each heat. The top three boats in each heat (9 boats total) advanced directly to the semifinals. The remaining 6 boats were placed in the repechage. The repechage featured a single heat, with the top three boats advancing to the semifinals and the remaining 3 boats (4th, 5th, and 6th placers in the repechage) being eliminated (13th, 14th, and 15th place overall). The 12 semifinalist boats were divided into two heats of 6 boats each. The top three boats in each semifinal (6 boats total) advanced to the "A" final to compete for medals and 4th through 6th place; the bottom three boats in each semifinal were sent to the "B" final for 7th through 12th.

All races were over a 2000 metre course.

Results

Heats

Heat 1

Heat 2

Heat 3

Repechage

Semifinals

Semifinal 1

Semifinal 2

Finals

Final B

Final A

Final classification

References

Rowing at the 1988 Summer Olympics
Men's events at the 1988 Summer Olympics